Cladium mariscoides, called smooth sawgrass, is a plant species native to eastern North America. It has been reported from every US state along the Gulf and Atlantic seashores except Louisiana, as well as every Great Lakes state, plus Vermont, Kentucky and Tennessee. It also occurs in every Canadian province except Alberta, British Columbia and Prince Edward Island. The species generally occurs along the shores of wetlands, including coastal salt marshes.

Cladium mariscoides is a perennial herb spreading by means of underground rhizomes. Leaves are very narrow, less than 3 mm across. Spikelets are chestnut brown, born in a panicle with 1st and 2nd order branching but not 3rd order.

References

mariscoides
Plants described in 1817
Flora of Canada
Flora of the United States